Statistics of the Cambodian League for the 2005 season.

Overview
Khemara Keila FC won the championship.

Teams
10 participants:
Hello United
Nagacorp
Khemara Keila FC
Royal Navy
Royal Cambodian Armed Force (RCAF)
Army Division of Logistics (General Logistics)
Military Police 
Kandal Province
Koh Kong Province
Siem Reap Province

Top of table
The top four team qualified to championship play-off
Khemara Keila FC
Hello United
Military Police
Nagacorp

Championship play-off

Semi-finals
05 Oct 2005 Hello United 4-2 Nagacorp

06 Oct 2005 Khemara Keila     2-1 Military Police

Third place

Final

References
RSSSF

C-League seasons
Cambodia
Cambodia
football